The 2012–13 Temple Owls basketball team represented Temple University during the 2012–13 NCAA Division I men's basketball season. The Owls, led by seventh year head coach Fran Dunphy, played their home games at the Liacouras Center and were members of the Atlantic 10 Conference. They finished the season 24–10, 11–5 in A-10 play to finish in a three way tie for third place. They lost in the quarterfinals of the Atlantic 10 tournament to Massachusetts. They received an at-large bid to the 2013 NCAA tournament where they defeated North Carolina State in the second round before losing in the third round to Indiana.

This was their last season as a member of the Atlantic 10 as they will join the American Athletic Conference in July 2013. With a win over Bowling Green on December 31, 2012, the Owls became only the 6th team in NCAA history to record 1,800 wins.

Roster

Schedule

|-
!colspan=9| Regular season

|-
!colspan=9| 2013 Atlantic 10 men's basketball tournament

|-
!colspan=9| 2013 NCAA tournament

References

Temple Owls men's basketball seasons
Temple
Temple
Temple
Temple